Strevell is a ghost town in Idaho near the border with Utah.
Location is Hwy 81 just after the Utah/Idaho border on Hwy 42 where Utah becomes Hwy 81 Idaho FR 587 Enters from east next closest Town is Naf Idaho on Yost  strevell RD. 4 Miles West

References

Ghost towns in Idaho